Amphicyclotulus dominicensis is a species of tropical land snail with a gill and an operculum, a terrestrial gastropod mollusk in the family Neocyclotidae.

Distribution
This species is endemic to the West Indian island of Dominica.

The type locality is Long Dilton, Dominica. The holotype is in National Museum of Natural History under number 535857.

Shell description 
Amphicyclotulus dominicensis has spiral cords which are clearly visible and raised.

There are only two species in the genus Amphicyclotulus in Dominica. The other species is Amphicyclotulus amethystinus, which has either no spiral threads or ones that are only weakly present.

Amphicyclotulus dominicensis is smaller than the Amphicyclotulus amethystinus. Amphicyclotulus dominicensis is more coarsely sculptured and has a higher spire. It has been found on the leeward and windward sides of the island of Dominica, at low elevations only.

References
This article incorporates CC-BY-3.0 text from the reference.

Neocyclotidae
Endemic fauna of Dominica